Theodora Komnene or Comnena (born ) was a niece of Byzantine emperor Manuel I Comnenus, and wife of King Baldwin III of Jerusalem.

Family
Theodora was a daughter of the sebastokratōr Isaac Komnenos by his second wife, Eirene Synadene. Her father was a son of Emperor John II Komnenos and Piroska of Hungary, daughter of King Ladislaus I of Hungary.

Her paternal uncles included Emperor Manuel I Komnenos. Her half-sister Maria Komnene married King Stephen IV of Hungary.

Queen consort of Jerusalem
Baldwin III of Jerusalem had taken control of the Kingdom of Jerusalem from his mother and Regent Queen Melisende in 1153. He was unmarried, however, and around 1157 it was decided by the Haute Cour that a wife should be sought from the Byzantine Empire, the kingdom's most powerful and wealthy neighbour. A Byzantine alliance would hopefully also bring much-needed money and military assistance against Nūr al-Dīn, sultan of Syria and Jerusalem's greatest enemy. 

Attard, archbishop of Nazareth, Humphrey II of Toron, constable of Jerusalem, Joscelin Piscellus, and William de Barris were sent to Constantinople to negotiate a marriage for the king (Attard died while on the mission). The ambassadors were delayed in Constantinople for almost an entire year but it was finally decided that Theodora would be chosen as Baldwin's wife. She was at the time only 12 or 13 years old, but was already renowned for her beauty. Her dowry was worth 100,000 hyperpyra, and William of Tyre estimated that her extravagant wedding clothes cost another 14,000 hyperpyra. As a dower from Baldwin, Theodora was granted the city of Acre, which she would hold as her own should Baldwin die childless. 

The ambassadors arrived in Jerusalem with Theodora in September 1158. Aimery of Limoges, the patriarch of Antioch, performed the marriage, as the patriarch of Jerusalem had not yet been consecrated. Baldwin was previously known for his frivolous lifestyle, but now became a devoted and loyal husband. The marriage was short and childless: Baldwin died only a few years later in 1162, leaving Theodora a widow at the age of about 17. Theodora received the city of Acre, as promised.

Relationship with Andronikos I Komnenos
A few years later in 1166, Theodora's kinsman Andronikos, a first cousin of her father, visited the kingdom and was named lord of Beirut by Baldwin's brother and successor Amalric I. Andronikos invited Theodora to Beirut, and the two eloped to Damascus, or as William says, Andronikos abducted her in collusion with Nūr al-Dīn. It was likely not an abduction; Andronikos was already married, and had already had an affair with Philippa, a sister of Prince Bohemund III of Antioch and of Manuel's wife Maria of Antioch, and he was likely trying to escape persecution by Manuel, who did not approve of these incestuous affairs. As there was no legal marriage, Acre was returned to King Amalric. Amalric had also married a Byzantine princess, Maria Komnene, and the imperial alliance remained intact. 

At the court of Nūr al-Dīn in Damascus, Andronikos and Theodora had two children together, Alexios and Eirene, although Andronikos was inevitably excommunicated. They also travelled to Baghdad, and then to the Sultanate of Rum where Andronikos was made lord of a castle in Paphlagonia.

Some years later Theodora and her children were captured and handed over to the emperor Manuel, who kept them in Constantinople as a bait to encourage Andronikos to return to his Byzantine allegiance. He did in fact capitulate and visited Constantinople in 1180 to submit to Manuel.

When he finally returned to Constantinople in 1182, becoming emperor in 1183, there is no evidence that Theodora went back to live with him. It was at this time, however, that their daughter Eirene married Alexios Komnenos, an illegitimate son of Emperor Manuel I and Theodora Vatatzina. At this time, too, Theodora interceded with Andronikos to pay the ransom for her nephew, Isaac, a former Byzantine governor of Isauria now a captive in Armenia; Andronikos afterwards regretted doing so, since Isaac rebelled and seized control of Cyprus.

K. Varzos suggests that Theodora Komnene and Theodora Vatatzina eventually conspired against Andronikos, but there seems to be no positive evidence of this. Her later history is not known.

Namesakes
Another Theodora Komnene was the wife of Prince Bohemund III of Antioch and sister of Queen Maria Komnene of Jerusalem. A third Theodora Komnene was the wife of Duke Henry II of Austria and mother of Duke Leopold V of Austria.

Sources

William of Tyre, A History of Deeds Done Beyond the Sea, trans. E.A. Babcock and A.C. Krey. Columbia University Press, 1943.
Bernard Hamilton, "Women in the Crusader States: The Queens of Jerusalem", in Medieval Women, edited by Derek Baker. Ecclesiastical History Society, 1978.
Steven Runciman, A History of the Crusades, vol. II: The Kingdom of Jerusalem. Cambridge University Press, 1952.

 

|-
 

 

1140s births
12th-century deaths
Theodora Komnene
Theodora Komnene
Theodora Komnene
12th-century Byzantine people
12th-century Byzantine women
Mistresses of Byzantine royalty